BYQ may refer to:

 the IATA code for Bunyu Airport, Indonesia
 the ISO 639-3 code for Basay language